The Battle of Lyman's Wagon Train was an incident in 1874, near Canadian, Texas.  A  area at the site was listed on the National Register of Historic Places in 2001 for its information potential as an archeological site. As an archeological resource, the National Register does not disclose the location of the site.

The engagement was part of the Red River War.

From September 9 to September 14, Wyllys Lyman and his troops fought off Comanche and Kiowa warriors.  It is also known as the Battle of the Upper Washita.

Tehan, a white member of the Kiowa who was imprisoned by the army, escaped in the event and returned to his Kiowa home.

A number of men received U.S. medals of honor for their performance.

A historical marker titled "Wagon Train Battle" in Hemphill County, Texas commemorates the event.

See also

National Register of Historic Places listings in Hemphill County, Texas

References

External links

1874 in Texas
Battles involving the Comanche
Lyman's Wagon Train
Conflicts in 1874
Native American history of Texas
Texas–Indian Wars
National Register of Historic Places in Hemphill County, Texas
Archaeological sites in Texas
September 1874 events